Ant-nose coin (coin like the nose of ant), also called ant nose money, yibi cowry, Yibi coin and so on,  was a small bronze coin minted by the state of Chu during the Warring States period. In Chinese, it is also called "鬼脸钱" (guǐ liǎn qián, coin like the face of a ghost).

See also 

 Zhou dynasty coinage

References 

Coins of ancient China
Bronze coins
Chu (state)
Chinese numismatics